Sergei Alexandrovich Yesenin (( 1895 – 28 December 1925), sometimes spelled as Esenin, was a Russian lyric poet. He is one of the most popular and well-known Russian poets of the 20th century, known for "his lyrical evocations of and nostalgia for the village life of his childhoodno idyll, presented in all its rawness, with an implied curse on urbanisation and industrialisation."

Biography

Early life

Sergei Yesenin was born in Konstantinovo in Ryazan Governorate of the Russian Empire to a peasant family. His father was Alexander Nikitich Yesenin (1873–1931), his mother's name was Tatyana Fyodorovna (nee Titova, 1875–1955).

Both his parents spent most of their time looking for work, father in Moscow, mother in Ryazan, so at age two Sergei was moved to the nearby village Matovo, to join Fyodor Alexeyevich and Natalya Yevtikhiyevna Titovs, his relatively well-off maternal grandparents, who essentially raised him.

The Titovs had three grown-up sons, and it was they who were Yesenin's early years' companions. "My uncles taught me horse-riding and swimming, one of them... even employed me as hound-dog, when going out to the ponds hunting ducks," he later remembered. He started to read aged five, and at nine began to write poetry, inspired originally by chastushkas and folklore, provided mostly by the grandmother whom he also remembered as a highly religious woman who used to take him to every single monastery she chose to visit. He had two younger sisters, Yekaterina (1905–1977), and Alexandra (1911–1981).

In 1904 Yesenin joined the Konstantinovo zemstvo school. In 1909 he graduated from it with an honorary certificate, and went on to study in the local secondary parochial school in Spas-Klepiki. From 1910 onwards, he started to write poetry systematically; eight poems dated that year were later included in his 1925 Collected Works. In all, Yesenin wrote around thirty poems during his school years. He compiled them into what was supposed to be his first book which he titled "Bolnye Dumy" (Sick Thoughts) and tried to publish it in 1912 in Ryazan, but failed.

In 1912, with a teacher’s diploma, Yesenin moved to Moscow, where he supported himself working as a proofreader's assistant at Sytin's printing company. The following year he enrolled in Chanyavsky University to study history and philology as an external student, but had to leave it after eighteen months due to lack of funds. In the University he became friends with several aspiring poets, among them Dmitry Semyonovsky, Vasily Nasedkin, Nikolai Kolokolov and Ivan Filipchenko. Yesenin’s first marriage (which lasted three years) was in 1913 to Anna Izryadnova, a co-worker from the publishing house, with whom he had a son, Yuri. 

1913 saw Yesenin becoming increasingly interested in Christianity, biblical motives became frequent in his poems. "Grisha, what I am reading at the moment is the Gospel and find a lot of things which for me are new," he wrote to his close childhood friend G. Panfilov. That was also the year when he became involved with the Moscow revolutionary circles: for several months his flat was under secret police surveillance and in September 1913 it was raided and searched.

Life and career

January 1914, Yesenin's first published poem "Beryoza" (The Birch Tree) appeared in the children's magazine Mirok (Small World). More appearances followed in minor magazines such as Protalinka and Mlechny Put. In December 1914 Yesenin quit work "and gave himself to poetry, writing continually," according to his wife. Around this time he became a member of the Surikov Literary and Music circle.

In 1915, exasperated with the lack of interest in Moscow, Yesenin moved to Petrograd. He arrived to Petrograd on 8 March and the next day met Alexander Blok at his home, to read him poetry. He was quickly acquainted with fellow-poets Sergey Gorodetsky, Nikolai Klyuev and Andrei Bely who were well known. Blok was especially helpful in promoting Yesenin's early literary career, describing him as "a gem of a peasant poet" and his verse as "fresh, pure and resounding", even if "wordy". 

The same year he joined the Krasa (Beauty) group of peasant poets which included Klyuyev, Gorodetsky, Sergey Klychkov and Alexander Shiryayevets, among others. In his 1925 autobiography Yesenin said that Bely gave him the meaning of form while Blok and Klyuev taught him lyricism. It was Klyuyev who introduced Yesenin to the publisher Averyanov, who in early 1916 released his debut poetry collection Radunitsa which featured many of his early spiritual-themed verse. "I would have eagerly relinquished some of my religious poems, large and small, but they make sense as an illustration of poets' progress towards the revolution," he would later write. Yesenin and Klyuyev maintained close and intimate friendship which lasted several years.

Later in 1915, Yesenin became a co-founder of the Krasa literary group and published numerous poems in the Petrograd magazines Russkaya Mysl, Ezhemesyachny Zhurnal, Novy Zhurnal Dlya Vsekh, Golos Zhizni and Niva. Among the authors he met later in the year were Maxim Gorky, Vladimir Mayakovsky, Nikolai Gumilyov and Anna Akhmatova; he also visited painter Ilya Repin in his Penaty. Yesenin's rise to fame was meteoric; by the end of the year he became the star of St Petersburg's literary circles and salons. "The city took to him with the delight a gourmet reserves for strawberries in winter. A barrage of praise hit him, excessive and often insincere," Maxim Gorky wrote to Romain Rolland.

On 25 March 1916, Yesenin was drafted for military duty and in April joined a medical train based in Tsarskoye Selo, under the command of colonel D.N. Loman. In 22 July 1916, at a special concert attended by the Empress Alexandra Fyodorovna (the train's patron) and her daughters, Yesenin recited his poems "Rus" and "In Scarlet Fireglow". "The Empress told me my poems were beautiful, but sad. I replied, the same could be said about Russia as a whole," he recalled later. His relationships with Loman soon deteriorated. In October, Yesenin declined the colonel's offer to write (with Klyuyev) and have published a book of pro-monarchist verses, and spent twenty days under arrest as a consequence.

In March 1917, Yesenin was sent to the Warrant Officers School but soon deserted Kerensky's army. In August 1917 (having divorced Izryadnova a year earlier) Yesenin married for a second time, to Zinaida Raikh (later an actress and the wife of Vsevolod Meyerhold). They had two children, a daughter Tatyana and a son Konstantin. The parents subsequently quarreled and lived separately for some time prior to their divorce in 1921. Tatyana became a writer and journalist and Konstantin Yesenin would become a well-known soccer statistician.

Yesenin supported the February Revolution. "If not for [it], I might have withered away on useless religious symbolism," he wrote later. He greeted the rise of the Bolsheviks too. "In the Revolution I was all on the side of the October, even if perceiving everything in my own peculiar way, from a peasant's standpoint," he remembered in his 1925 autobiography. Later he criticized the Bolshevik rule, in such poems as "The Stern October Has Deceived Me". "I feel very sad now, for we are going through such a period in [our] history when human individuality is being destroyed, and the approaching socialism is totally different from the one I was dreaming of," he wrote in an August 1920 letter to his friend Yevgeniya Livshits. "I never joined the RKP, being further to the left than them," he maintained in his 1922 autobiography.

Artistically, the revolutionary years were exciting time for Yesenin. Among the important poems he wrote in 1917–1918 were "Prishestviye" (The Advent), "Preobrazheniye" (Transformation, which gave the title to the 1918 collection), and "Inoniya". In February 1918, after the Sovnarkom issued the "Socialist Homeland is in Danger!" decree-appeal, he joined the esers' military unit. He actively participated in the magazine Nash Put (Our Way), as well as the almanacs Skify (Скифы) and Krasny Zvon (in February his large poem "Marfa Posadnitsa" appeared in one of the latter). In September 1918 Yesenin co-founded (with Andrey Bely, Pyotr Oreshin, Lev Povitsky and Sergey Klychkov) the publishing house Трудовая Артель Художников Слова (the Labor Artel of the Artists of the Word) which reissued (in six books) all that he had written by this time.

In September 1918, Yesenin became friends with Anatoly Marienhof, with whom he founded the Russian literary movement of imaginism. Describing their group's general appeal, he wrote in 1922: "Prostitutes and bandits are our fans. With them, we are pals. Bolsheviks do not like us due to some kind of misunderstanding." In January 1919, Yesenin signed the Imaginists' Manifest. In February he, Marienhof and Vadim Shershenevich, founded the Imaginists' publishing house. Before that, Yesenin became a member of the Moscow Union of Professional Writers and several months later was elected a member of the All-Russian Union of Poets. Two of his books, Kobyliyu Korabli (Mare's Ships) and Klyuchi Marii (The Keys of Mary) came out later that year.

In July–August 1920, Yesenin toured the Russian South, starting in Rostov-on-Don and ending in Tiflis, Georgia. In November 1920, he met Galina Benislavskaya, his future secretary and close friend. Following an anonymous report, he and two of his Imaginist friends, brothers Alexander and Ruben Kusikovs, were arrested by the Cheka in October but released a week later on the solicitation of his friend Yakov Blumkin. In the course of that year, the publication of three of Yesenin's books were refused by publishing house Goslitizdat. His Triptych collection came out through the Skify Publishers in Berlin. Next year saw the collections Confessions of a Hooligan (January) and Treryaditsa (February) published. The drama in verse Pygachov came out in December 1921, to much acclaim.

In May 1921, he visited a friend, the poet Alexander Shiryaevets, in Tashkent, giving poetry readings and making a short trip to Samarkand. In the fall of 1921, while visiting the studio of painter Georgi Yakulov, Yesenin met the Paris-based American dancer Isadora Duncan, a woman 18 years his senior. She knew only a dozen words in Russian, and he spoke no foreign languages. Nevertheless, they married on 2 May 1922. Yesenin accompanied his celebrity wife on a tour of Europe and the United States. His marriage to Duncan was brief and in May 1923, he returned to Moscow. 

In his 1922 autobiography, Yesenin wrote: "Russia's recent nomadic past does not appeal to me, and I am all for civilization. But I dislike America intensely. America is a stinking place where not just art is being murdered, but with it, all the loftiest aspirations of humankind. If it's America that we are looking up to, as [a model for our] future, then I'd rather stay under our greyish skies... We do not have those skyscrapers that's managed to produce up to date nothing but Rockefeller and McCormick, but here Tolstoy, Dostoyevsky, Pushkin and Lermontov were born."

In 1923, Yesenin became romantically involved with the actress Augusta Miklashevskaya to whom he dedicated several poems, among them those of the Hooligan's Love cycle. In the same year, he had a son by the poet Nadezhda Volpina. Alexander Esenin-Volpin grew up to become a poet and a prominent activist in the Soviet dissident movement of the 1960s.  Since 1972, till his death in 2016, he lived in the United States as a famous mathematician and teacher.
As Yesenin's popularity grew, stories began to circulate about his heavy drinking and consequent public outbursts. In autumn 1923, he was arrested in Moscow twice and underwent a series of enquiries from the OGPU secret police. Fellow poet Vladimir Mayakovsky, wrote that, after his return from America, Yesenin became more visible in newspaper police log sections than in poetry.

More serious were the accusations of anti-Semitism against Yesenin and three of his close friends, fellow poets, Sergey Klytchkov, Alexei Ganin and Pyotr Oreshin, made by Lev Sosnovsky, a prominent journalist and close Trotsky associate. The foursome retorted with an open letter in Pravda and, in December, were cleared by the Writers' Union burlaw court. It was later suggested, though, that Yesenin's departure to the Caucasus in the summer of 1924 might have been a direct result of the harassment by the NKVD. Earlier that year, fourteen writers and poets, including his friend Ganin, were arrested as the alleged members of the (apparently fictitious) Order of the Russian Fascists, then tortured and executed in March without trial.

In January–April 1924, Yesenin was arrested and interrogated four times. In February, he entered the Sheremetev hospital, then was moved into the Kremlin clinic in March. Nevertheless, he continued to make public recitals and released several books in the course of the year, including Moskva Kabatskaya. In August 1924 Yesenin and fellow poet Ivan Gruzinov published a letter in Pravda, announcing the end of the Imaginists.

In early 1925, Yesenin met and married Sophia Andreyevna Tolstaya (1900–1957), a granddaughter of Leo Tolstoy. In May, what proved to be his final large poem Anna Snegina came out. During the year, he compiled and edited The Works by Yesenin in three volumes which was published by Gosizdat posthumously.

Death
On 28 December 1925, Yesenin was found dead in his room in the Hotel Angleterre in Leningrad. His last poem Goodbye my friend, goodbye (До свиданья, друг мой, до свиданья) according to Wolf Ehrlich was written by him the day before he died. Yesenin complained that there was no ink in the room, and he was forced to write with his blood.

According to his biographers, the poet was in a state of depression and committed suicide by hanging.

After the funeral in Leningrad, Yesenin's body was transported by train to Moscow, where a farewell for relatives and friends of the deceased was also arranged. He was buried 31 December 1925, in Moscow's Vagankovskoye Cemetery. His grave is marked by a white marble sculpture.

There is a theory that Yesenin's death was actually a murder by OGPU agents who staged it to look like suicide. The novel Yesenin. Story of a Murder by Vitali Bezrukov, is devoted to that version of Yesenin's death. In 2005, a TV serial, Sergey Yesenin, based on the novel, was shown on Channel One Russia, with Sergey Bezrukov playing Yesenin. Facts tending to support the assassination hypothesis were cited by Stanislav Kunyaev and Sergey Kunyaev in the final chapter of their biography of Yesenin.

Enraged by his death, Mayakovsky composed a poem called To Sergei Yesenin, where the resigned ending of Yesenin's death poem is countered by these verses: "in this life it is not hard to die, / to mold life is more difficult." In a later lecture on Yesenin, he said that the revolution demanded "that we glorify life." However, Mayakovsky himself would commit suicide in 1930.

Cultural impact
Yesenin's suicide triggered an epidemic of copycat suicides by his mostly female fans. For example, Galina Benislavskaya, his ex-girlfriend, killed herself by his graveside in December 1926. Although he was one of Russia's most popular poets and had been given an elaborate state funeral, some of his writings were banned by the Kremlin during the reigns of Joseph Stalin and Nikita Khrushchev. Nikolai Bukharin's criticism of Yesenin contributed significantly to the banning. 

Only in 1966 were most of his works republished.  Today Yesenin's poems are taught to Russian schoolchildren; many have been set to music and recorded as popular songs. His early death, coupled with unsympathetic views by some of the literary elite, adoration by ordinary people, and sensational behavior, all contributed to the enduring and near mythical popular image of the Russian poet.

Ukrainian composer Tamara Maliukova Sidorenko (1919-2005) set several of Yesenin’s poems to music.

Bernd Alois Zimmermann included his poetry in his Requiem für einen jungen Dichter (Requiem for a Young Poet), completed in 1969.

The Ryazan State University is named in his honor.

Multilanguage editions
Anna Snegina (Yesenin's poem translated into 12 languages; translated into English by Peter Tempest)

Works

 The Scarlet of the Dawn (1910)
 The high waters have licked (1910)
 The Birch Tree (1913)
 Autumn (1914)
 Russia (1914)
A Song About a Dog/The B*tch (1915)
 I'll glance in the field (1917)
 I left the native home (1918)
 Hooligan (1919)
 Hooligan's Confession (1920) (Italian translation sung by Angelo Branduardi)
 I am the last poet of the village (1920)
 Prayer for the First Forty Days of the Dead (1920)
 I don't pity, don't call, don't cry (1921)
 Pugachev (1921)
 Land of Scoundrels (1923)
 One joy I have left (1923)
 A Letter to Mother (1924)
 Tavern Moscow (1924)
 Confessions of a Hooligan (1924),
 A Letter to a Woman (1924),
 Desolate and Pale Moonlight (1925)
 The Black Man (1925)
 To Kachalov's Dog (1925)
Who Am I, What Am I (1925)
 Goodbye, my friend, goodbye (1925) (His farewell poem)

References

External links

Collection of Sergey Yesenin's Poems in English:
 Sergey Yesenin. Collection of Poems
 Sergey Yesenin. Collection of Poems. Bilingual Version
 The Fugue Aesthetics of J.H. Stotts: Esenin, Footnotes for a Triptych at blogspot.com (Bio and English translation)
 Sergey Yesenin's Autobiography. (English translation)
 Biography, photos and poetry (Russian)
 Yesenin's poetry (Russian)
 Yesenin's museum in Viazma (Russian)
 Alexander Novikov sings songs based on Yesenin's poetry (10 songs in WMA format
 The Dark Man (English translation)
 Farewell My Friend (English translation)
 The Poems by Sergey Esenin (English)
 
 

1895 births
1925 deaths
1925 suicides
People from Rybnovsky District
People from Ryazan Governorate
Russian male poets
Moscow State University alumni
Suicides by hanging in the Soviet Union
Suicides by hanging in Russia
Former Old Believers
Burials at Vagankovo Cemetery
20th-century Russian poets
20th-century Russian male writers
Russian military personnel of World War I